Alonzo Thomas Fellow Smith (10 June 1886 – 8 January 1959) was an Australian rules footballer who played with Essendon in the Victorian Football League (VFL).

Notes

External links 

1886 births
1959 deaths
Australian rules footballers from Melbourne
Essendon Football Club players